Kevin Nee (born August 21, 1985) is an American professional Strongman athlete.

Biography
Born in Framingham, Massachusetts, Nee began his strength training at the age of 14. As a high school student at Hopedale High School in Hopedale, Massachusetts, he began competing in the teenage level Strongman competitions. He won the teenage heavyweight division of 2002 USA Teenage Strongman. Nee has competed in five of the World's Strongest Man championships. In 2005, he competed in the tournament held in Chengdu, China; at the age of 20, he made history as the second youngest competitor ever to compete in this annual sports event.

Nee also competed in the 2006 World's Strongest Man championship in Sanya, China, but did not make it to the final round of competition. In 2007, at the World's Strongest Man championship held in Long Beach, California, Nee finished in eighth place. He has also competed in the annual World's Strongest Man Super Series Competition at Mohegan Sun in Uncasville, Connecticut, where he finished fifth in 2006 and second in 2007.

While he was still competing as an amateur strongman, Nee was featured in a 2005 episode of the MTV reality show True Life: I Want the Perfect Body 2. It was in the same episode that it was mentioned he was named the Strongest Teen in the United States. In 2007, Men's Fitness magazine named him among the world's “25 Fittest Men”.

The 6'2, 295-pound Nee, who has a degree in supply chain management from Arizona State University, resides in the Boston, MA area.

Competition record
 2005
 7.  - Super Series 2005: Mohegan Sun
 9.  - Pan-American Strongman 2005
 2006
 7.  - FitExpo Strongman 2006
 7.  - Ironman Strongman 2006
 5.  - Super Series 2006: Mohegan Sun
 4.  - America's Strongest Man 2006
 7.  - World Strongman Cup Federation 2006: Grodzisk Mazowiecki

 2007
 5.  - Polish Grand Prix
 2.  - All-American Strongman Challenge 2007
 2.  - Super Series 2007: Mohegan Sun
 6.  - Super Series 2007: Venice Beach
 4.  - World Strongman Cup Federation 2007: Dartford
 8.  - World's Strongest Man 2007, United States
 2008
 7.  - Super Series 2008: New York
 5.  - Super Series 2008: Viking Power Challenge
 2009
 5.  - All-American Strongman Challenge 2009
 5.  - Giants Live 2009: Stavanger
 11.  - Super Series 2009: Bucharest
 4.  - Giants Live 2009: Malbork
2010
10. - Strongman Champions League 2010 Ireland
2011
3. - Asian World Cup

References

1985 births
Living people
American strength athletes
Arizona State University alumni
People from Hopedale, Massachusetts
Sportspeople from Worcester County, Massachusetts